Latata is the debut Japanese extended play by South Korean girl group (G)I-dle released by Universal Music Japan on July 31, 2019.

Background and release

On May 19, 2019 it was revealed that (G)I-dle will make their Japanese debut with the EP Latata, with title track Latata on July 31, 2019. It will be released in three versions: a limited CD+DVD edition (A), a limited CD+PHOTOBOOK 28P edition (B), and a regular CD edition. Hann (Alone) (Japanese version) will only available as part of an iTunes bundle.

The song "For You" was written and composed by member Minnie.

Promotion
(G)I-dle held a live showcase at the Mainabi Blitz Akasaka on July 23, 2019. The showcase sold over 1,000 tickets with an attendance of 1,500 people.

Track listing

Charts

Release history

References

External links

2019 debut EPs
Cube Entertainment EPs
(G)I-dle EPs
Japanese-language EPs
Universal Music Japan albums
Albums produced by Jeon So-yeon